José Francisco Montes (Honduras, Comayagua, 1830 - Honduras, Comayagua, 1888) was President of Honduras (acting): 11 January - 4 February 1862 and 4 December 1862 - 20/26 June 1863.

References 

Presidents of Honduras
1830 births
1888 deaths